The 2018–19 Sydney Sixers Women's season was the fourth in the team's history. Coached by Ben Sawyer, they finished the regular season of WBBL04 on top of the ladder to claim their third-consecutive minor premiership while captain Ellyse Perry set a new Women's Big Bash League record for most runs in a single campaign and was named Player of the Tournament.

In the semi-finals, the Sixers won a "miracle" encounter against the Melbourne Renegades which was notable for a last-ball run out that forced the game into a super over. In the championship decider, the Sixers fell short of achieving a three-peat, losing a "classic" contest to the Brisbane Heat by three wickets.

Squad 
Each 2018–19 squad featured 15 active players, with an allowance of up to five marquee signings including a maximum of three from overseas.

Under a new rule, Australian marquees were classed as players who held a national women's team contract at the time of signing on for their WBBL|04 team. This, combined with the introduction of two-year contracts ahead of the previous season, meant that the Sixers would inadvertently exceed their marquee player limit in 2018–19. To address this inequity, an injured or unavailable Sixers marquee could only be replaced by a domestic player.

Personnel changes for the Sixers ahead of WBBL|04 included:

 Sarah Coyte returned to her original WBBL team, the Adelaide Strikers.
 Angela Reakes departed the team and subsequently joined the Melbourne Stars.
 Local teenage players Stella Campbell, Hayley Silver-Holmes and Tahlia Wilson were added to the roster.

The table below lists the Sixers players and their key stats (including runs scored, batting strike rate, wickets taken, economy rate, catches and stumpings) for the season.

Ladder

Fixtures 
All times are local time

Regular season

Knockout phase 

In the Renegades' first finals appearance, with three runs required off the last ball for an upset victory, Sophie Molineux was found short of her ground attempting the winning run due to a "miracle" piece of team fielding by Sixers players Erin Burns, Sarah Aley and Alyssa Healy. In the resulting super over, Sixers captain Ellyse Perry hit a six off Molly Strano to eliminate the Renegades from the tournament. The match, in conjunction with the other semi-final played earlier in the day, was hailed as a showcase of "the irrefutable rise of women's cricket" and "sport with drama, skill and unpredictability – a potent recipe for success".

In front of the league's first-ever sellout crowd, the visiting Brisbane Heat pulled off an upset victory to win their maiden championship and deny a Sixers three-peat. Requiring 34 runs with 36 balls remaining, the Heat looked to be in control of the chase until the 15th over when Dane van Niekerk struck twice—including the removal of linchpin Beth Mooney for 65 through a forward-diving catch by Ellyse Perry in the outfield. Although Brisbane would continue to lose wickets, Laura Harris did enough to steady the ship, eventually hitting the winning runs with three wickets and four deliveries to spare. Player of the Final Mooney, who had been receiving on-field medical treatment for the flu and heat stroke, revealed in a post-match interview that her ongoing game delays instigated sledging from several opponents: "It was kind of nice to know while I wasn't feeling well, I was going well enough to piss them off and they were getting frustrated at how long I was taking to face up... I've played enough cricket against (the Sixers) to know what gets under their skin and we definitely won that battle."

Statistics and awards 

 Most runs: Ellyse Perry – 778 (1st in the league)
 Highest score in an innings: Alyssa Healy – 112* (69) vs Adelaide Strikers, 28 December 2018
 Most wickets: Marizanne Kapp – 20 (equal 3rd in the league)
 Best bowling figures in an innings: Marizanne Kapp – 4/27 (4 overs) vs Hobart Hurricanes, 16 December 2018
 Most catches (fielder): Ellyse Perry – 9 (equal 2nd in the league)
 Player of the Match awards:
 Ellyse Perry – 6
 Alyssa Healy – 2
 Erin Burns, Ashleigh Gardner, Dane van Niekerk – 1 each
 Sixers Player of the Tournament: Ellyse Perry
 WBBL|04 Player of the Tournament: Ellyse Perry (1st)
 WBBL|04 Team of the Tournament: Alyssa Healy, Marizanne Kapp, Ellyse Perry

References 

2018–19 Women's Big Bash League season by team
Sydney Sixers (WBBL)